Yo ("Me") is a 2015 Mexican drama film, directed and written by Matías Meyer. The film stars Raúl Silva, as a young man, with limited mental skills. He says he is fifteen years old, although he seems to be older. He lives and works in his mother's restaurant by a busy freeway. One day he meets Elena, an eleven-year-old girl, who will change his life forever. Yo is adapted by Meyer and Alexandre Auger from Histoire du pied et autres fantaisies by French author J.M.G. Le Clézio.

Yo premiered at the 13th Morelia International Film Festival and was awarded for Best Mexican Feature Film and Best Actor for Raúl Silva. The film also received a nomination for Best Adapted Screenplay at the Ariel Awards of 2016.

Cast
Raúl Silva as Yo
Elizabeth Mendoza as Mamá Yo
Ignacio Rojas Nieto as Pady
Isis Vanesa Cortés as Elena
Mireya Ivonne Morales as Sra. Elia
Alfonso Miguel González as Poncho
Melody Petite as Jenny
Félix Miranda Pérez as Capataz

External links

References

2015 films
2015 drama films
Mexican drama films
2010s Spanish-language films
2010s Mexican films